The Humane Society of the Pikes Peak Region (commonly abbreviated as HSPPR) is a nonprofit corporation in both Colorado Springs, Colorado and Pueblo, Colorado. Incorporated in 1949, HSPPR rescues stray or forsaken pets and facilitates adoption. A variety of fundraising events throughout the fiscal year keep them financially viable.

Events 
In the fall, HSPPR hosts the Pawtoberfest 5K/beer festival at Bear Creek Regional Park. During the winter, they hold a 12 Strays of Christmas adoption drive in partnership with Daniels Long Chevrolet.

Ratings and reviews 
The Humane Society of the Pikes Peak Region is a Better Business Bureau-accredited charity, meeting the 20 standards of Charity Accountability. In fact, it is rated 100/100 for Transparency & Accountability by Charity Navigator, with an overall rating of 4/4 stars. In terms of animal care certification, HSPPR has also been accredited by the American Animal Hospital Association.

References

External links 
 Official website
 Facebook page
 YouTube channel

Animal welfare organizations based in the United States
Organizations based in Colorado Springs, Colorado